Green and Gray is the seventh studio album by American indie rock band Pile. It was released on May 3, 2019 through Exploding in Sound.

Critical reception
Green and Gray was met with generally favorable reviews from critics. At Metacritic, which assigns a weighted average rating out of 100 to reviews from mainstream publications, this release received an average score of 78, based on 5 reviews.

Track listing

Charts

References

2019 albums
Exploding in Sound albums